Eftekhar (in Persian افتخار lit. Glory or Honor) is a Persian language daily newspaper published in Iran. Mohammad Navidi-Kashani served as the managing director of the daily.

See also
List of newspapers in Iran

References

Newspapers published in Iran
Persian-language newspapers